Scopula despoliata is a moth of the  family Geometridae. It is found in Australia (Queensland) and New Guinea.

References

Moths described in 1861
despoliata
Moths of Australia
Moths of New Guinea